The New Yangon General Hospital is a public hospital in Yangon, Myanmar. It is also a teaching hospital of University of Medicine 1, Yangon, University of Nursing, Yangon and the University of Medical Technology, Yangon. The hospital was constructed and completed in 1984, using Japanese grant aid, provided by the Japan International Cooperation Agency (JICA).

References 

Hospital buildings completed in 1984
Hospitals in Yangon
Hospitals established in 1984
Japan International Cooperation Agency